Amougies Airfield  is a small airfield just south of the Kluisberg, in Amougies, part of the Walloon municipality of Mont-de-l'Enclus, Hainaut, Belgium.

As of 2010, it only hosts ULM operations. Visiting pilots should carefully respect noise abatement procedures.

References

External links 
 Operator's website, in French and Dutch

Airports in Hainaut (province)